Fatimah Abdullah née Ting Sai Ming is a Malaysian politician from the Parti Pesaka Bumiputera Bersatu (PBB), a component party of the ruling Gabungan Parti Sarawak (GPS) coalition.

Background
Fatimah hails from Kampung Teh in Dalat, Sarawak. Her father is a Foochow Chinese and her mother is a Melanau. She was brought up a Muslim by her maternal grandmother. She is married to Datu Dr. Adi Badiozaman Tuah, a social activist and the Director of the Sarawak Islamic Council of Educational Services Bureau. Together they have two children.

Fatimah is an educationist. She was a former principal of Sekolah Menengah Kebangsaan Puteri Wilayah in Kuala Lumpur.

Political career 
Fatimah's candidacy for the post of Women's Chief in the Parti Pesaka Bumiputera Bersatu (PBB), a component party of the ruling GPS coalition, was unopposed after Empiang Jabu Anak Antak stepped down in 2018. Fatimah, from the Bumiputera wing, takes over from Empiang, who is from the Pesaka wing.

Election results

Honours
  :
  Commander of the Order of the Star of Hornbill Sarawak (PGBK) - Datuk (2011)
  Knight Commander of the Order of the Star of Sarawak (PNBS) - Dato Sri (2017)

References

Living people
1957 births
People from Sarawak
Sarawak state ministers
Malaysian people of Chinese descent
Commanders of the Order of the Star of Hornbill Sarawak
Knights Commander of the Most Exalted Order of the Star of Sarawak
Parti Pesaka Bumiputera Bersatu politicians
Melanau people
Members of the Sarawak State Legislative Assembly
Women MLAs in Sarawak
21st-century Malaysian women politicians
Malaysian Muslims